Kyle Turnbull (born 22 January 1995) is a Scottish professional footballer who plays as a left back for Bo'ness United.

Career
Turnbull made his senior debut for Falkirk against Clyde early in the 2013–14 season.

He signed for Albion Rovers in July 2014. After three years with the club, Turnbull moved to SJFA East Superleague club Linlithgow Rose for the 2017–18 season.

Turnbull moved to Sauchie Juniors in July 2019.

He would later sign for Bo'ness United in February 2020.

References

External links

Scottish footballers
1995 births
Albion Rovers F.C. players
Falkirk F.C. players
Linlithgow Rose F.C. players
Living people
Association football fullbacks
Sportspeople from Livingston, West Lothian
Footballers from West Lothian